The Bedford HA was a car derived van introduced in 1963 by Bedford, based on the Vauxhall Viva (HA) family car. It was also known as the Bedford Beagle in estate form and Bedford Roma in small campervan form. The Beagle was an officially sanctioned conversion based on the 8 cwt van, carried out by Martin Walter of Folkestone, Kent. The Beagle received rear side windows and a fold-down rear seat; leaving  of luggage space with the seat in use.



History

The Bedford HA was extremely popular with utility companies in the United Kingdom, particularly the Royal Mail, British Rail, electricity boards, the GPO (later British Telecom (BT)), and British Gas. Many other firms such as British European Airways and Meals on Wheels services had large fleets as well. It was the inspiration for Postman Pat's original van. It was originally available in 6 cwt and heavier duty 8 cwt models (payloads of ), with the chassis codes HAE and HAV respectively. Gross vehicle weights were  respectively. The 8 cwt had a heavier rear axle, bigger tyres, and a sixth leaf in the rear springs. The 8 cwt was generally better equipped, offering a number of chromed trim parts (bumpers, mirrors, etcetera) and slightly plusher interior fittings. By 1971 the 6 cwt had been downgraded further yet, and now only came with a driver's seat as standard. A fold-down rear seat was available as an option.

In September 1964, for the 1965 model year, the Viva and HA Van received minor changes such as a quicker steering rack, new door trim, and a modified choke control. In Australia, the Bedford HA was sold as the "Bedford Handi-Van" from 1964 until 1970.

Engines
The early  version had a lower compression ratio than the Viva saloon  (7.3:1 rather than the usual 8.5:1), producing  gross, or  net, both at 5,200 rpm. In 1967, the HA received the engine of the changed Viva. This  was essentially the same as the earlier powerplant; although net power was down to a claimed  at 4,600 rpm. It ran on the lowest rated fuel and was fitted with a  -bore carburettor for even higher fuel mileage. The later models powered by the 1,256 cc engine offered  gross at 5,400 rpm, or  net at 4,600 rpm. As for all three generations of HAs, the compression ratio remained 7.3 to 1. For the lighter duty HA 110 there was also an 'Economy' version, with a CD carburettor (constant depression), a redesigned manifold, and a different camshaft.

The HA continued on in production for twenty years, until 1983, when it was supplanted by the short lived Vauxhall Chevette based Bedford Chevanne which was in turn replaced by the Opel-based Bedford Astravan / Bedford Astramax. Despite the fact that the Vauxhall Viva upon which it was based had gone through two further model generations, the bodywork of the HA van stayed the same until its eventual discontinuation in 1983, although it did receive some of the technical upgrades from the newer HB and HC Vivas. A pickup was also made by Martin Walter (Dormobile) - who also made the Beagle conversion - and by Walker Bodies of Watford. Made in very small numbers (believed to be around 60 in total) only a handful of these survive today: they were originally sold to companies and private buyers directly through Vauxhall/Bedford dealerships.

The BTV

In the early 1970s there were a number of basic utility vehicles developed for the developing world. Volkswagen (EA489), Citroën (FAF), and many others including General Motors tried to create cheap and basic transport which could be manufactured locally with a minimal up-front investment. GM's effort was developed by General Motors Overseas Operations (GMOO) and was called the "Basic Transportation Vehicle" (BTV). It was marketed under a variety of names depending on where it was built. The little truck has a simple body made up entirely of flat surfaces placed atop a basic frame, while most mechanicals and what interior there was derived from the HA. The BTV was at one time or another manufactured in Malaysia (as the Bedford Harimau, this was the first iteration to be manufactured, from May 1972), Costa Rica (Amigo), Ecuador (Andino), Nicaragua (Pinolero, by INDEVESA, S.A.), Paraguay (GM Mitaí), the Philippines (Amigo or Tiger), Portugal (Amigo), and in Suriname as the Moetete 1200/1300. It was also available in Indonesia in 1977 and 1978, with slightly different bodywork, as the Morina (without a company name). While Vauxhalls were unusual in Indonesia, the Morina's engine had been used in the Holden Torana (LJ and TA series), which was popular as a taxi in Jakarta. The Morina was built by General Motors' local subsidiary P.T. Garuda Diesel, and power was claimed to be  SAE. "Morina" is an acronym of MObil Rakyat INdonesiA ("Indonesian People's Car").

The Ecuadorean Andino entered production in 1973 and continued until 1976. The Paraguayan Mitaí had its own bodywork which fully enveloped the front wheels, and was only available in red, white, or blue - the colours of their flag. Production was also planned for Singapore, Indonesia, Thailand, Guatemala, and certain other countries. Some sources state that no more than 3,000 BTVs were built across the world.

GM Philippines soon developed a more car-like version of the BTV with a four-door station wagon body (mainly used as a taxi) called the GM Harabas.
General Motors also built another basic vehicle using the Vauxhall engine in the 1970s, the South African Chevrolet Nomad.

References

External links

HA